The High Commissioner of Australia to Cyprus is an officer of the Australian Department of Foreign Affairs and Trade and the head of the High Commission of the Commonwealth of Australia in Nicosia, with responsibility for both the internationally recognised Republic of Cyprus and the unrecognised Turkish Republic of Northern Cyprus. The position has the rank and status of an Ambassador Extraordinary and Plenipotentiary and is currently held by Fiona McKergow since January 2022. There has been a resident Australian High Commissioner in Cyprus since 1982, from 1973 to 1982 the Ambassador to Greece held non-resident accreditation for Cyprus.

Posting history
Following the independence of Cyprus on 16 August 1960, Australia maintained low level relations and contacts with the new Cypriot Government, with the Australian Embassy in Athens, Greece, having reporting responsibility for Cyprus. In response to a question on the status of Australia's relations with Cyprus from the Leader of the Opposition, Gough Whitlam, in the House of Representatives, on 28 March 1972 the Minister for Foreign Affairs, Nigel Bowen, noted to the Parliament: "Australia’s bilateral relations with the Republic of Cyprus have not been considered sufficiently substantial at this stage to justify the dual accreditation of an Australian High Commissioner to Cyprus from another post. However, the Australian Embassy in Athens has a general responsibility for reporting on Cyprus and the staff of the Embassy visit Cyprus at regular intervals." However, not longer after this response, the Australian Government appointed the serving Ambassador to Greece, Francis Hall, as the non-resident accredited high commissioner to Cyprus from 19 April 1973. In July 1975, the Australian Government announced the establishment of a resident High Commission in Nicosia, initially under an acting high commissioner. The first resident High Commissioner, Mary McPherson, commenced office from 9 February 1982.

Heads of mission

High Commissioners resident in Athens, Greece

Resident High Commissioners

References

External links

Australian High Commission, Cyprus

 
Cyprus
Australia
Australia and the Commonwealth of Nations
Cyprus and the Commonwealth of Nations